Lasse Juhani Kukkonen (born 18 September 1981) is a retired Finnish professional ice hockey defenceman. He last played for Oulun Kärpät of the Finnish Liiga. Earlier in his career, he had a four-year stint in the National Hockey League (NHL) with the Chicago Blackhawks and Philadelphia Flyers. After his career in ice hockey, Kukkonen is working as a lecturer and trainer specialising in mental coaching and leadership.

Playing career
Kukkonen was drafted by the Chicago Blackhawks as their fifth-round pick, 151st overall, in the 2003 NHL Entry Draft. He played ten National Hockey League games during the 2003–04 NHL season, after which he returned to his hometown Kärpät in the SM-liiga. Kukkonen won the SM-liiga gold medal with Kärpät in 2005.

In the 2006-07 season, Kukkonen returned to the Chicago Blackhawks and played in 54 games before he was dealt to the Philadelphia Flyers along with a 3rd round draft pick in a three-way deal with the Chicago Blackhawks and Detroit Red Wings on 26 February 2007. With the Flyers, Kukkonen was put on a defensive pairing with Joni Pitkänen, also a native of Oulu. The two were also a pairing for 4 years in Finland. On 17 May 2007 he signed a two-year contract with the Flyers.

On 24 June 2009, Kukkonen signed a two-year deal with Russian team Avangard Omsk of the KHL.

International play
He was named to the Finnish Olympic team at the 2006 Winter Olympics after defenceman Sami Salo was injured, and played in both the semifinal match versus Russia and the gold medal match versus Sweden. 
Kukkonen was named the Finnish national team as captain of the 2018 Winter Olympics in South Korea.

Career statistics

Regular season and playoffs

International

Awards and honours

Other awards:
Champions Hockey League:  2016

References

External links

Brooklynite Hockey - Lasse Kukkonen

1981 births
Living people
Avangard Omsk players
Chicago Blackhawks draft picks
Chicago Blackhawks players
Finnish expatriate ice hockey players in Russia
Finnish expatriate ice hockey players in Sweden
Finnish expatriate ice hockey players in the United States
Finnish ice hockey defencemen
Ice hockey players at the 2006 Winter Olympics
Ice hockey players at the 2010 Winter Olympics
Ice hockey players at the 2014 Winter Olympics
Ice hockey players at the 2018 Winter Olympics
Medalists at the 2006 Winter Olympics
Medalists at the 2010 Winter Olympics
Medalists at the 2014 Winter Olympics
Metallurg Magnitogorsk players
Norfolk Admirals players
Olympic bronze medalists for Finland
Olympic ice hockey players of Finland
Olympic medalists in ice hockey
Olympic silver medalists for Finland
Oulun Kärpät players
Philadelphia Flyers players
Philadelphia Phantoms players
Sportspeople from Oulu
Rögle BK players